Joseline Hernandez (born November 3, 1986), also known as "The Puerto Rican Princess", is a Puerto Rican reality television personality, rapper, and actress. She came to prominence as a main cast member of the VH1 reality series Love & Hip Hop: Atlanta. She appeared on the show for six seasons alongside her boyfriend Stevie J, with whom she also starred in the spin-off Stevie J & Joseline: Go Hollywood.

Early life 
Joseline Hernandez was born on November 3, 1986, in Ponce, Puerto Rico, and grew up in the public housing system of Puerto Rico. Her biological father died from a heroin overdose. She moved to Florida at the age of 6, along with her mother Carmen, stepfather Luis, her older sister Yanira, and her four brothers, Jorge, Hisael, Kermit and Luis Jr. Her youngest brother has autism and requires special care. From the age of 16, she began stripping in order to provide for her family. During this time, she was arrested in 2003 and 2007 under the name Shenellica Bettencourt, for lewd and lascivious behavior.

Career
In 2007, Hernandez filmed a failed television pilot for Showtime, centered around a group of strippers working at the Diamond Cabaret in Miami, where she gave her name as Shenellica Bettencourt.

Breakthrough, Love & Hip Hop: Atlanta (2012–2017)
Hernandez was discovered by Grammy Award-winning record producer Stevie J while performing as a stripper at the Onyx Club in Atlanta. In 2012, she became part of the original cast of Love & Hip Hop: Atlanta, appearing as Stevie J's new artist, an aspiring rapper, singer and actress. It was later revealed that the two were romantically involved, much to the anger of his girlfriend, Mimi Faust. The trio's love triangle became Love & Hip Hop: Atlantas leading storyline and Hernandez continued as a main cast member for six seasons. It became the highest rated show of the Love & Hip Hop franchise and is one of the highest rating shows on VH1 overall, averaging 3.5 million viewers per episode.

The show's success and notoriety catapulted Hernandez to stardom, leading to appearances at the 2013 AVN Awards, the 2013 BET Hip Hop Awards and the 2015 BET Awards, as well as guest spots on This Is Hot 97, K. Michelle: My Life, The Wendy Williams Show and Hip Hop Squares. She also made several cameo appearances with Stevie in various hip hop and R&B videos, including the music videos for Trey Songz's "Hail Mary", The Game's "I Remember", Ciara's "Body Party" and Faith Evans' "I Deserve It".

During the course of the show, Hernandez released a series of reggaeton and dancehall-influenced singles and music videos, many of which are sung and spoken in Spanish, her native tongue. She performed her songs "Church" and "Stingy with My Kutty Katt" live at ''Love & Hip Hop: Atlantas fourth season reunion. She also appeared on Rocko's mixtape Wordplay 2 on the track "Girls Gone Wild" (with Young Dro). In 2016, Hernandez starred with Stevie in the spin-off show Stevie J & Joseline: Go Hollywood, which premiered to 2.6 million viewers. In 2017, she starred in her own television special, Joseline's Special Delivery, which premiered on VH1 on May 1, 2017, and documented the birth of her child.

On June 5, 2016, Hernandez revealed that she had filmed an acting role on Lee Daniels' television series Star, which aired from December 14, 2016, on Fox. She appeared in the pilot episode as Michelle, a stripper. She returned in a recurring role for three more episodes in 2017. Hernandez appeared as a guest co-host on the syndicated talk show The Real from January 23 to 27, 2017, and again from May 1 to 5, 2017. On June 1, 2017, Hernandez quit Love & Hip Hop: Atlanta during the taping of the sixth season's reunion, amid tensions with creator Mona Scott-Young and the show's producers.

Joseline's Cabaret (2017–present)
On August 6, 2017, Hernandez released a preview of the song "Run Me My Money" on her Instagram account, along with a tag #MONAFEA ("fea" meaning "ugly" in Spanish). It was immediately alleged that "Run Me My Money" is a diss record aimed at Scott-Young. Hernandez commented "The show people, let's just get this very clear, all them bitches that go through Love & Hip Hop, they work for me. I get royalties on all them asses, so that was the inspiration." However, she did not directly confirm whether she was taking aim at Scott-Young.

Over the next few weeks, Hernandez released snippets of eight new songs, "Mi Cualto", "Slay", "Playboy Bunny", "Papi Lindo", "Finger Fuck a Check", "Spanish Rocksta", "No Me Importa" and "Gold" (feat. Miss Mulatto). On October 8, 2017, she released "Run Me My Money" in full as a digital download. On November 15, 2017, she released "Hate Me Now". This song was widely reported to be as a diss track against Cardi B. Although "Hate Me Now" was poorly received by critics, it peaked at number nine on the HotNewHipHop's Top 100 Songs chart due to "its beef-centric content". In January 2018, Hernandez released a preview of the music video for "Hate Me Now" on her official Instagram page.

On January 8, 2018, it was reported that Hernandez was filming a new reality show, Joseline Takes Miami, produced by Carlos King. Joseline appeared as a commentator (via satellite link) on the talk show Bossip on WE tv from August 30, 2018, until October 4, 2018. On March 4, 2019, it was reported that production on Joseline Takes Miami had been stalled and that the network was requesting reshoots. The project never made it to air. On September 29, 2019, Joseline appeared as a guest star on Bravo's Married to Medicine.

On October 11, 2019, it was announced that Joseline had signed a deal with streaming service Zeus Network to create, produce and star in her own reality show franchise. The first incarnation, Joseline's Cabaret: Miami, would premiere January 19, 2020. On December 11, 2019, VH1 announced that Joseline would be returning to the Love & Hip Hop franchise after a three year hiatus and join the cast of Love & Hip Hop: Miami for its third season, which would premiere January 6, 2020. On January 9, 2020, WE tv announced that Joseline and her boyfriend Balistic Beats would appear on the latest season of Marriage Boot Camp: Hip Hop Edition, which would premiere February 6, 2020.

Personal life
Hernandez is openly bisexual.

She is also of Afro-Puerto Rican descent.

She and Stevie initially claimed to have married in 2013. However, Stevie J admitted in 2016 that the marriage was faked for publicity and in court documents released later that year, Joseline confirmed they were in a long-term relationship and never legally married. The couple's break up was documented in Love & Hip Hop: Atlanta's fifth season, although they have reconciled on-and-off since then.

During filming of Love & Hip Hop: Atlanta'''s fifth season reunion, Hernandez revealed she was pregnant with Stevie's sixth child. She gave birth to their daughter on December 28, 2016.

In April 2019, it was reported that Hernandez was dating music producer Robin Ingouma, known professionally as Balistic Beats. The couple got engaged later that year.

Discography

Singles

Guest appearances

Filmography

Television

References

External links

1986 births
Living people
Rappers from Atlanta
Bisexual singers
Bisexual women
LGBT rappers
Hispanic and Latino American rappers
Puerto Rican women rappers
21st-century Puerto Rican women singers
Puerto Rican female models
21st-century Puerto Rican actresses
LGBT Hispanic and Latino American people
Puerto Rican LGBT singers
Puerto Rican LGBT actors
American female erotic dancers
Hip hop models
Participants in American reality television series
21st-century American rappers
20th-century American LGBT people
21st-century LGBT people
21st-century women rappers